Yeshivas Neveh Zion is a yeshivah in Kiryat Ye'arim, on the outskirts of Jerusalem. It was originally founded in Moshav Beit Yehoshua before moving in 1982.

Administration and faculty
 Rabbi Chaim Yisroel Blumenfeld ("The Mash"), Rosh Yeshiva
 Rabbi Avraham Falk, Menahel
 Rabbi Avraham Schwab, Mashgiach
 Rabbi Avrohom Freidman, Administrator
 Rabbi Dovid Sternberg, Talmudic director
 Rabbi Shaul Dov Fellman, Educational Director
 Rabbi Mendy Goldman, Assistant Rosh Yeshiva
 Rabbi Avrohom Aharon Sudransky, Head Rabbi  
 Rabbi Dovid Slavin, Head Rabbi
 Rabbi E M Klugman, Famous Author, Mechanech and Highest Shiur in Yeshiva
 Rabbi Avrohom M Prager, Rebbi and recruiter

Notable alumni
 David Draiman, musician, outspoken Israel advocate known as the lead singer of Disturbed (band)

References

External links
 Official Website
 Official Facebook Page

Jewish education
Orthodox yeshivas in Israel